Tuscola is a city in Taylor County, Texas, United States. The population was 742 at the 2010 census. It is part of the Abilene, Texas Metropolitan Statistical Area.

Geography

Tuscola is located at  (32.209060, –99.797126).

According to the United States Census Bureau, the city has a total area of 0.7 square miles (1.9 km), all of it land.

Climate

The climate in this area is characterized by hot, humid summers and generally mild to cool winters.  According to the Köppen climate classification system, Tuscola has a humid subtropical climate, Cfa on climate maps.

Demographics

2020 census

As of the 2020 United States census, there were 850 people, 305 households, and 203 families residing in the city.

2000 census
As of the census of 2000, there were 714 people, 273 households, and 202 families residing in the city. The population density was 971.2 people per square mile (372.5/km). There were 307 housing units at an average density of 417.6 per square mile (160.2/km). The racial makeup of the city was 97.20% White, 0.14% African American, 0.28% Native American, 0.14% Asian, 0.70% from other races, and 1.54% from two or more races. Hispanic or Latino of any race were 7.28% of the population.

There were 273 households, out of which 37.4% had children under the age of 18 living with them, 61.5% were married couples living together, 10.6% had a female householder with no husband present, and 26.0% were non-families. 23.8% of all households were made up of individuals, and 12.8% had someone living alone who was 65 years of age or older. The average household size was 2.62 and the average family size was 3.08.

In the city, the population was spread out, with 28.6% under the age of 18, 7.3% from 18 to 24, 27.9% from 25 to 44, 23.4% from 45 to 64, and 12.9% who were 65 years of age or older. The median age was 37 years. For every 100 females, there were 89.9 males. For every 100 females age 18 and over, there were 87.5 males.

The median income for a household in the city was $38,068, and the median income for a family was $42,396. Males had a median income of $31,484 versus $21,845 for females. The per capita income for the city was $18,661. About 3.7% of families and 6.8% of the population were below the poverty line, including 5.5% of those under age 18 and 15.7% of those age 65 or over.

Education
The city of Tuscola is served by the Jim Ned Consolidated Independent School District and home to the Jim Ned High School Indians.

Notable people

 Colt McCoy, former quarterback for the University of Texas Longhorns and the Cleveland Browns, currently a quarterback for the Arizona Cardinals
 Rick Roderick, prominent philosopher and professor
 Ed Sprinkle, former American football player and coach

References

Cities in Taylor County, Texas
Cities in Texas
Cities in the Abilene metropolitan area